Leslie Francis Howe (3 March 1912 – 23 February 1999) was an English professional footballer who played for Enfield, Northfleet United and Tottenham Hotspur and represented England at schoolboy level.

Football career 
Howe played for non-league Enfield before joining the Spurs nursery club Northfleet United. He signed as a professional in August 1930 for Tottenham Hotspur. On 26 December 1930, Howe made his debut at right half at Southampton. He played in every outfield position for the White Hart Lane club which also included an appearance as an emergency goal keeper against Coventry City. The versatile player featured in 182 games and scored 28 goals in all competitions for the Lilywhites until World War II in 1939.

Later years
Howe served his country in the RAF. After the hostilities had ended Howe returned to the Spurs in the capacity of managing the club's A side. Outside of football he ran public houses in the London area before becoming the manager of Enfield Town F.C. in 1948–49. Howe worked as plumbing supervisor till his retirement in March 1978 and lived in Wood Green. He died on 23 February 1999 at the North Middlesex Hospital, Edmonton.

References

1912 births
1999 deaths
People from Hertford
English footballers
Enfield F.C. players
Northfleet United F.C. players
Tottenham Hotspur F.C. players
English Football League players
Association football midfielders
Chelmsford City F.C. wartime guest players
Royal Air Force personnel of World War II
Royal Air Force personnel
Military personnel from Hertfordshire